State Route 209 (SR 209) is a  state highway in Lauderdale County in the western portion of the U.S. state of Tennessee. It connects US 51 with the cities and towns of Henning, Ripley and Gates and, via SR 88, Halls.

Route description

SR 209 begins at an intersection with US 51/SR 3 south of Henning. It then proceeds northeastward and enters the Henning city limits and in downtown Henning SR 209 has a brief concurrency with SR 87. It then continues northward and enters Ripley city limits. It has a half-interchange with SR 19 and enters downtown Ripley and serves as the southern terminus for SR 208. After this it mainly enters rural countryside and follows a railroad line for about  until it reaches the town of Gates where it has a brief concurrency with SR 180 and ends at an intersection with SR 88 and SR 180.

History
All of SR 209 is a former alignment of US 51.

Junction list

See also

References

209
Transportation in Lauderdale County, Tennessee
U.S. Route 51